Christopher Bentley (born ) is a former politician in Ontario, Canada. He was a Liberal member of the Legislative Assembly of Ontario from 2003 to 2013. He represented the riding of London West and was a cabinet minister in the government of Dalton McGuinty.

Background
Bentley received a Bachelor of Arts degree from the University of Western Ontario in London, Ontario, and obtained a law degree from the University of Toronto in 1979. Two years later, he obtained a Master's degree from Cambridge University in England. Bentley has practiced criminal and labour law, with the firm of Bentley & LeRoy LLP. In 1985, he was a founder and first chairperson of Neighbourhood Legal Services London & Middlesex, a legal clinic intended to assist low-income clients.

Since 1992, Bentley has worked as a part-time professor at Western. He helped establish the university's Law School Careers Office, and has lectured at various continuing education courses. In 2000, he published a book entitled Criminal practice manual: A practical guide to handling criminal cases.

Politics
Bentley ran for the provincial legislature in the 2003 general election, contesting the riding of London West as a Liberal. He was successful, defeating incumbent Progressive Conservative Bob Wood by over 10,000 votes. The Liberals won the election, and Bentley was appointed Minister of Labour on October 23, 2003. After a cabinet shuffle on June 29, 2005, he was named as Minister of Training, Colleges and Universities.

Bentley was re-elected in the 2007 election and was named Attorney General of Ontario shortly thereafter. In January 2010 he was assigned the additional portfolio of Minister of Aboriginal Affairs.

He retained his seat in the October 2011 provincial election, and was named Minister of Energy. Bentley was soon mired in a controversy over the government's decision made during the election campaign to scrap unpopular gas plants being constructed in Mississauga and Oakville - the move was seen as a politically expedient one made to improve the Liberal Party's chances of retaining the 5 ridings it held in the area. The election returned a minority government and the emboldened opposition demanded that Bentley's ministry release all documents related to the decision. Bentley delayed prior to releasing 36,000 pages in September and insisted that all documents had been released. After it became known that there were an additional 20,000 documents Bentley was cited by a rare contempt motion by a legislative committee and was facing a contempt motion of the legislature when McGuinty unexpectedly ended the legislative session by proroguing the legislature on October 15.

Previously, Bentley had widely been seen as Premier Dalton McGuinty's heir apparent but on October 25, 2012, ten days after McGuinty announced his resignation, Bentley announced that he would not be a candidate in the Liberal Party leadership convention being held to choose McGuinty's successor and that he too would be leaving politics. Bentley resigned his seat in the legislature effective February 14, 2013.

Cabinet positions

Electoral record

References

External links

1956 births
21st-century Canadian politicians
Alumni of Wolfson College, Cambridge
Attorneys General of Ontario
Lawyers in Ontario
Living people
Ontario Liberal Party MPPs
Politicians from London, Ontario
University of Toronto Faculty of Law alumni
University of Western Ontario alumni
Academic staff of the University of Western Ontario